Lakshminarayana Puram  is a village in Attili Mandal, West Godavari district of the Indian state of Andhra Pradesh.[1] It is located in Attili mandal in Kovvur revenue division. Lakshminarayanapuram ( LKSH ) has its own train station connecting major cities. Lakshminarayana Puram pin code is 534209 and postal head office is at Mogallu. Lakshminarayana Puram is surrounded by Veeravasaram Mandal towards East , Attili Mandal towards North , Penumantra Mandal towards East , Bhimavaram Mandal towards West. 

External links 
http://lnpuram.in.

Villages in West Godavari district